The Bucherer reaction in organic chemistry is the reversible conversion of a naphthol to a naphthylamine in the presence of ammonia and sodium bisulfite.  The reaction is widely used in the synthesis of dye precursors aminonaphthalenesulfonic acids.

C10H7-2-OH  +  NH3      C10H7-2-NH2  +  H2O

The French chemist Robert Lepetit was the first to discover the reaction in 1898.  The German chemist Hans Theodor Bucherer (1869–1949) discovered (independent from Lepetit) its reversibility and its potential especially in industrial chemistry. Bucherer published his results in 1904 and his name is connected to this reaction. The organic reaction also goes by the name Bucherer-Lepetit reaction or (wrongly) the Bucherer-Le Petit reaction.

The reaction is used to convert 1,7-dihydroxynaphthalene into 7-amino-1-naphthol and 1-aminonaphthalene-4-sulfonic acid into 1-hydroxynaphthalene-4-sulfonic acid. It is also useful for transamination reactions of 2-aminonaphthalenes.

Mechanism
In the first step of the reaction mechanism a proton adds to a carbon atom with high electron density therefore by preference to C2 or C4 of naphthol (1). This leads to resonance stabilized adducts 1a-1e.

De-aromatization of the first ring of the naphthalene system occurs at the expense of 25 kcal/mol. In the next step a bisulfite anion adds to C3 through 1e. This results in the formation of 3a which tautomerizes to the more stable 3b to the sulfonic acid of tetralone. A nucleophilic addition follows of the amine with formation of 4a and its tautomer 4b loses water to form the resonance stabilized cation 5a. This compound is deprotonated to the imine 5b or the enamine 5c but an equilibrium exists between both species. The enamine eliminates sodium bisulfite with formation of naphthylamine 6.

It is important to stress that this is a reversible reaction. The reaction is summarized as follows:

The Bucherer carbazole synthesis is a related reaction.

References 

Substitution reactions
Name reactions